The 1929 Singapore Open, also known as the 1929 Singapore Open Singles Badminton Championship, took place from 19 October – 16 November 1929 at the Old Chinese Chin Woo Athletic Association Hall in City Hall with the final been played at the Singapore Chinese Girls' School Hall in Somerset, Singapore. The ties were played over a month with the first round ties being played on the 19th of October and the final was played on the 16th of November. The championship started as a men's singles competition before the rest of the disciplines were added in the subsequent editions.

E.J. Vass won the inaugural championship when he defeated See Gim Hock in two straight games to win the men's singles final.

Origins
Badminton was first introduced in Singapore by the British and was initially played among the British upper-class residing in Singapore. However, the game spread quickly to the rest of the local population which included English-educated elites, civil servants, white-collar workers and Chinese school students. Amid the rising popularity of badminton, badminton enthusiasts started forming clubs, or “parties”, to meet and play the game.

In 1928, an 'unofficial' badminton championship was held by the Amateur Sporting Association in Singapore as there was no national governing body for badminton back then. In 1929, the Singapore Badminton Association (SBA) was established to promote the sport and organise competitions and its first official annual open championship was held that same year with the best players chosen to represent Singapore in the regional tournaments. The event organisers were Mr Tan Boo Teck, the first president of SBA and its committee members. The winner will receive the Aw Boon Haw Shield, which was originally presented by Mr Aw Boon Haw to the Amateur Sporting Association.

Final results

Men's singles

References 

Singapore Open (badminton)
1929 in badminton